Dylan R. Berry (born October 30, 1974) Is an Aria Award nominated, Hollywood Music in Media Award and Mark Award-winning Music Producer, Creative Director, serial Entrepreneur and entertainment industry investor. Berry has managed, published and produced media music for television shows including the Academy Awards, American Idol, So You Think You Can Dance, Scream Queens and the MTV Music Awards. He has created branded music for over major networks including Starz, Time Warner Sportsnet, Time Warner News Network, Root Sports Network, ESPN Sports Center and all 10 of the Encore Network stations, for which Berry won a Hollywood Music in Media Award. Berry is a 28 time Platinum record producer and has also composed and coordinated music for the Oscars, Spike Awards, Victoria's Secret Fashion Shows, among others.

Career

Hollowstone Music 
From 2001 to 2009, Berry was President and Owner of Hollowstone Music, where he composed music for television channels such as History and National Geographic. Under Hollowstone Music, Dylan wrote over 100 hours of music alongside his business partner, Noah Lifschey. The company was later sold in 2009.

Levels Music Group 
Following Hollowstone Music, Dylan launched Levels Music Group, a partnership with Levels Audio, where he composed music for television and award shows including The Academy Awards, American Idol, So You Think You Can Dance, The Sing-Off, Surviving the Cut, Downfall, the Comedy Central Roast Series, The MTV Music Awards and many others.

Smash Haus Music Group 

Dylan Berry is listed in the top 1% "most prolific" composers in media music on IMDb and has composed music for 30+ TV Networks including Time Warner Sportsnet, Time Warner News, Encore, Starz, ESPN Sportscenter and more.

Berry currently owns and operates Smash Haus Music Group, a company which deploys proprietary technologies throughout the media industry providing original music at scale for media production companies for use in media, television and branded content.

He is credited with providing music for television shows and specials including Academy Awards, American Idol, So You Think You Can Dance Here Comes Honey Boo Boo America's Got Talent, Amish Mafia, Kevin Hart's Laugh at My Pain, The Sing Off and America's Best Dance Crew, among others.

Record Production Work 
Berry is an Aria Nominated, Mark Award and Hollywood Music in Media Award-winning record producer and a 28 time Platinum record Producer. 

Currently a member of the trip hop, dub revival group Frivolous Drivel with Greco Rossetti.

Former partner and founder of the production team, The Filthy Fidgets with business partner and co-producer Stefan Litrownik. Together the team is credited with producing for notable acts such as Imagine Dragons, One Direction, Andy Grammer, The Living End, Verdine White of Earth, Wind & Fire, Emblem3 and Billy Ray Cyrus.

Bompop Media 
Bompop Media is a media production company in Hollywood, California that produces high-impact, celebrity and industry-based, behind-the scenes-media for TV, web and radio. Bompop Media syndicates this content globally through a network of strategic partners in the social and content creator space.

Berry is the host and founder of Bompop Media, which broadcasts BompopTV & Bompopradio a weekly influencer and industry-related talk show that features celebrity talent, supports emerging talent while exploring the roots to realities of working in Hollywood and the Entertainment industry. Bompopradio is a partnership with collaborator, TV personality and notable influencer DJ Skee, who was voted by Forbes and Rolling Stone Magazine as one of the most influential tastemakers in music and media.

In early 2016, Bompopradio transitioned to BompopTV, an audiovisual web series which explores the depths and realities of leading creators, personalities and tastemakers in music and entertainment. Later that year, Berry was awarded 3 YouTube Silver play buttons.

Dylan hosted 2016 and 2017 Hollywood Music in Media Awards of which he had one two years earlier for his work on Encore Network Theme Packages.

SoundCloud 

In March 2020, BompopTV was acquired by SoundCloud. Following the acquisition, Dylan was made the program director for Dash Radio's 'SoundCloud Radio', a 24/7 music station catering to 240mm music makers worldwide. He is currently the host of the 'Emerging Artist Hour' which airs every Friday at 12PM PST / 3PM EST on SoundCloud Radio.

Awards

Hollywood Media in Music Awards

References 

1974 births
Living people
21st-century American composers
21st-century American male musicians
American record producers
American radio hosts